Suo Ma (born 2 December 1979 in Beijing) is a Chinese volleyball player, and now plays for Guangdong Evergrande.

Career
Suo won the 2004 Asian Club Championship gold medal, playing with Bayi Yiyang High-Tech District.

Clubs
  Bayi (Army) (1999-2000
  Nanjing Force (2000–2001)
  Bayi (Army) (2001-2009)
  Guangdong Jianlong (2009–2010)
  Guangdong Evergrande (2010-）

Awards

Clubs
 1999-2000 Chinese Volleyball League -  Bronze medal, with Bayi
 2000-2001 Chinese Volleyball League -  Runner-Up, with Nanjing Force
 2001-2002 Chinese Volleyball League -  Champion, with Bayi
 2002-2003 Chinese Volleyball League -  Runner-Up, with Bayi
 2003-2004 Chinese Volleyball League -  Runner-Up, with Bayi
 2004-2005 Chinese Volleyball League -  Runner-Up, with Bayi
 2007-2008 Chinese Volleyball League -  Runner-Up, with Bayi
 2010-2011 Chinese Volleyball League -  Runner-Up, with Guangdong Evergrande
 2011-2012 Chinese Volleyball League -  Champion, with Guangdong Evergrande

References

External links
 SOHU News

Chinese women's volleyball players
Living people
1979 births
Volleyball players from Beijing
Middle blockers
21st-century Chinese women